The 1998–99 Alabama–Huntsville Chargers ice hockey team represented the University of Alabama in Huntsville in the 1998–99 NCAA Division I men's ice hockey season. The Chargers were coached by Doug Ross who was in his seventeenth season as head coach. After six seasons in Division II, including two National Championships, UAH began play in as an independent in Division I, playing a schedule mixed with Division I and II teams. The Chargers played their home games in the Von Braun Center.

Roster

|}

Regular season

Schedule

Standings

Statistics

Skaters

Goaltenders

References

Alabama Huntsville
Alabama–Huntsville Chargers men's ice hockey seasons
Ala